The End is the second studio album by American hip hop group Three 6 Mafia. It is the follow up to their debut album Mystic Stylez. The album was released on December 3, 1996 by Prophet Entertainment. This album shows a distinct change in production from their debut album.

“Walk Up 2 Yo House” is a re-recorded song of the same name, which originally appeared on the group’s 1994 mixtape Smoked Out, Loced Out.

Track listing
All songs are produced by DJ Paul and Juicy J

Credits
Three 6 Mafia:
DJ Paul - Rapper, producer, executive producer, keyboards, scratching
Juicy J - Rapper, producer, executive producer, scratching
Lord Infamous - Rapper
Koopsta Knicca - Rapper
Gangsta Boo - Rapper
Crunchy Black - Rapper
Jeanine Sharisse Norman and Shontelle Norman - Singing on "Good Stuff"
DJ Slicse Tee - Programming, scratching, keyboards
Nick Jackson - Executive producer
Insane Wayne - Piano on "Life or Death"
DJ Jus Borne - Recording, mixing
Larry Nix - Mastering
Julious Carr - Photography
Niko Lyras - Recording, mixing

Charts

References

1996 albums
Three 6 Mafia albums
Horrorcore albums
Albums produced by DJ Paul
Albums produced by Juicy J